Brandon Hill, also known as St Brandon's Hill, is a hill close to Bristol city centre, between the districts of Clifton and Hotwells, in south west England.

At the summit is the Cabot Tower, opened in 1897 to commemorate the 400th anniversary of John Cabot's voyage from Bristol to Newfoundland in 1497.

The upper part of the hill is a steep park, Brandon Hill Park, divided into informal gardens, a small nature reserve and open grassland. The two-hectare nature reserve has been run since 1980 by the Avon Wildlife Trust who have their headquarters beside the park.  The wildflower meadow includes ox-eye daisies, yellow rattle and knapweed. A pond provides a breeding site for frogs, toads and smooth newts. The butterfly garden supplies food for caterpillars and many kinds of butterflies. Birds such as jay, bullfinch and blackcap are seen in the reserve. Native trees and shrubs have been planted, and the meadow is cut for hay in July.

The lower slopes of the hill were developed in the 18th and 19th centuries.  St George's Church lies on Great George Street on the eastern slope, Berkeley Square is on the northern edge, and the school buildings of Queen Elizabeth's Hospital are on the western side.

History 
Brandon Hill was granted to the council in 1174 by the Earl of Gloucester and was used for grazing until 1625 when it became a public open space, possibly the oldest municipal open space in the country. Before the Reformation, a hermitage and chapel dedicated to the Irish saint Brendan stood at the summit of the hill, in which a series of hermits lived between 1314 and 1480, including the anchoress Lucy de Newchurch. During the late eighteenth and early nineteenth century it was a popular venue for public meetings by reform groups like the Chartists. In 1832, the hill was the location of the Great Reform Dinner, which was famously gatecrashed.

From 1840 onward Brandon Hill was improved with walls and walks. A crowd of 30,000 watched the launch of SS Great Britain from the hill on 7 July 1843. It remained a site of popular protest however, with 20,000 unemployed workers gathering at the top the hill in January 1880 to protest their situation.

Popular culture

In the popular television series, Skins, Brandon Hill features on a number of occasions; including, Cassie's suicide attempt and as the rendezvous point for Sid and Cassie at the climax of the first series.

In the Rabbit Premier League, a Fantasy Football league hailing from Downers Grove, Illinois, a team in the Cottontail International Division is based in Bristol, specifically Brandon: The Brandon Hill Perlfees.

Marcus H / soiled wrote the track Brandon Hill Tandle Hill which featured on his album Splices and Phases.

See also
Parks of Bristol

References

External links 

Hills of Bristol
Parks and open spaces in Bristol